Candida Mary Doyle (born 25 August 1963) is an Irish musician who is keyboard player and occasional backing vocalist with the band Pulp, which she joined in 1984. She joined her brother, drummer Magnus Doyle in the line-up replacing the previous keyboard player, Tim Allcard who had left the band.

Biography
Doyle attended piano lessons from age 8, but did not practise despite finding the experience enjoyable. At age 16 Doyle was diagnosed with rheumatoid arthritis. 

During Doyle's first few years in the group, Pulp were not enjoying financial success; she has been recorded as saying that she spent more money on the band than she made from it.  She kept jobs in two toy shops in Manchester, before being sacked from one for a "lack of dedication".  Although Pulp "sort of split up" in the period around 1986, they went on to release Freaks in 1987 with Doyle on board for her first album.

When playing live with the band Doyle has used Farfisa Compact Professional and Roland XP-10 synthesizers as well as Akai S3000 samplers.

Other artistic members of her family include her mother Sandra Voe, an actress who has appeared in Coronation Street, and two musician brothers. Her grandfather owned a fishing factory in the Shetland Islands. Doyle has lived in many places, including Belfast (where she was born), Manchester, Sheffield from the age of ten and where Pulp formed, and London, her current home.

Since Pulp began a hiatus in 2002, Doyle has occasionally appeared live with Jarvis Cocker, playing keyboards. Following this period, with Pulp's 2011 reunion, Doyle joined the rest of the Different Class line-up on stage in concert for their UK comeback gig at the Isle of Wight Festival on 11 June 2011.

References

External links
 Unofficial Pulp website

1963 births
Living people
Keyboardists from Northern Ireland
Pulp (band) members
Musicians from Belfast
British women in electronic music
Women keyboardists
Women musicians from Northern Ireland
Rock musicians from Northern Ireland
Britpop musicians